The Canopus Hill Observatory, located approximately 12 km from Hobart in Tasmania, Australia, is an optical astronomy observatory belonging to the University of Tasmania (UTAS). Due to the high southern latitude, the Canopus Hill Observatory is able to observe and study the Magellanic Clouds. However, the observatory has closed down due to the "encroaching light pollution from the Hobart suburbs". According to the Astronomical Society, light pollution reduces the vision of the night sky, becoming a "major menace to amateur and professional astronomers alike".

Telescope

The Canopus Hill Observatory has a variety of telescope instrumentation, including a 2-channel high speed photometer with UBVR, clear filters, a CCD photometer with SITe 512x512 pixel illuminated backside-thinned CCD and quick change 6-channel filter wheel. According to the UTAS, these telescope instrumentations are attached at the f/11 Cassegrain focus. There is also a 16" telescope that is used for observatory open nights for public viewing, photographic work and the Astronomical Society of Tasmania.

See also
 Bisdee Tier Optical Astronomy Observatory
 List of astronomical observatories

References

External links 
 observatory web page at UTAS
 Optical Astronomy at UTAS

Astronomical observatories in Tasmania